The Ninety Nine All Stars Tour was a tour of ice hockey exhibition games where the Ninety Nine All Stars team toured five countries during the 1994–95 NHL lockout. It was formed by Wayne Gretzky, IMG and some of Gretzky's personal friends.

The purpose of the tour was to stay in shape during the lockout, raise money for charities and to promote ice hockey around the world. The team played a total of eight games in five countries, six against professional club teams and two against national All Star teams.

Ninety Nine All Stars Roster

Goalies
 Grant Fuhr#
 Kelly Hrudey

Defensemen
 Rob Blake#
 Paul Coffey#
 Todd Gill
 Charlie Huddy
 Al MacInnis#
 Marty McSorley

Forwards
 Pat Conacher
 Russ Courtnall
 Sergei Fedorov#
 Doug Gilmour#
 Tony Granato
 Wayne Gretzky#
 Brett Hull#
 Jari Kurri#
 Steve Larmer
 Mark Messier#
 Kirk Muller
 Warren Rychel
 Rick Tocchet
 Steve Yzerman#

Coaches
 Doug Wilson (head coach)
 Walter Gretzky (assistant coach)
 Mike Barnett (General Manager)
 Claes Elefalk (Tour Coordinator)

List of games
 December 1, 1994: 3-4 loss vs Detroit Vipers (IHL)
 Steve Yzerman, Sergei Fedorov, and Paul Coffey, all from the Detroit Red Wings, did not appear in this game. Future NHL star Miroslav Satan scored the winning goal for the Vipers.
 December 3, 1994: 7-1 win vs Jokerit (Finland)
 December 4, 1994: 3-4 OT loss vs Ilves Tampere (Finland)
 December 6, 1994: 6-3 win vs Norwegian Spectrum All Stars (Norway)
 December 9, 1994: 8-3 win vs Djurgårdens IF (Sweden)
 December 10, 1994: 5-2 win vs Västra Frölunda HC (Sweden)
 December 12, 1994: 5-6 OT loss vs Malmö IF (Sweden)
 December 14, 1994: 8-5 win vs German All Stars in Freiburg (Germany)

See also
 List of international games played by NHL teams
 List of international ice hockey competitions featuring NHL players

References
The World Cup of Hockey

1994 in ice hockey
National Hockey League All-Star Games
Wayne Gretzky